Macdonald School is a common school name, especially in Canada, where many schools are named for Canada's first prime minister, Sir John A. Macdonald, and other members of the Macdonald family.

Archbishop MacDonald High School, Edmonton, AB, Canada
W. Ross Macdonald School, Brantford, ON, Canada
Sir John A. Macdonald High School, Halifax, NS, Canada
Laurier Macdonald High School, Montreal, QC, Canada
Sir John A. Macdonald Secondary School (Waterloo, Ontario), Canada
Sir William MacDonald Elementary School, Vancouver, BC, Canada
Sir John A Macdonald Junior High School, Calgary, AB, Canada
Sir John A. Macdonald Secondary School (Hamilton, Ontario), Canada
Macdonald High School, Sainte-Anne-de-Bellevue, QC, Canada
Macdonald-Cartier High School, Saint-Hubert, QC, Canada
Sir John A. Macdonald Collegiate Institute, Agincourt, Scarborough, Toronto, ON, Canada

See also
Macdonald Elementary School (disambiguation)